The Wai Apu people are one of the native peoples of  Buru island in Maluku, Indonesia, typically inhabiting the north-east of the island in what are now the Namlea and  districts. Research from the Indonesian  Ministry of Social Affairs in 1985 numbers the Wai Apu population at approximately 44,048.

Religion 
Accordingly bumilale occupies a central position within the Wai Apu belief system, conceptualised as a paradise surpassing all other regions in its beauty, one which must be protected from outside harm to preserve its harmony.

In the Wai Apu cosmology, Buru island (bupolo) is likened metaphorically to a human, with the various geographic features representing anatomical features:

 Head: Mount Kapalatmada,
 Left hand: Wanibe river,
 Right hand: Waemala river,
 Back: Garan forest,
 Stomach: ,
 Genitals: Mount Date,
 Left foot: Waeapo River,
 Right foot: .

See also 
 Buru
 Seram
 Maluku

References 

Wai Apu